The Clan of the Cave Bear is a 1980 novel and epic work of prehistoric fiction by Jean M. Auel about prehistoric times.  It is the first book in the Earth's Children book series, which speculates on the possibilities of interactions between Neanderthal and modern Cro-Magnon humans.

Setting
The novel references the advance of the polar ice sheets, setting the story before 19,950 years Before Present (BP) or 18,000 years BCE, when the farthest southern encroachment of the last glacial period of the current ice age occurred. Auel's time-frame, sometime between 29,950 and 26,950 years BP or 28,000 and 25,000 BCE, corresponds generally with archaeological estimates of the Neanderthal branch of mankind disappearing.

Plot summary 

A five-year-old girl, Ayla, who readers come to understand is Cro-Magnon, is orphaned and left homeless by an earthquake that destroys her family's camp. She wanders downstram, naked and unable to feed herself, for several days.  Having been attacked and nearly killed by a cave lion and suffering from starvation, exhaustion, and infection of her wounds, she collapses, on the verge of death.

The narrative switches to a group of people who call themselves "Clan" and who the reader comes to understand are Neanderthal. Their cave was destroyed in the earthquake and they are searching for a new home. The medicine woman of the group, Iza, discovers the ailing girl and asks permission from her brother Brun, the Clan leader, to help her, despite the child being clearly a member of "the Others," the distrusted antagonists of the Clan. The child is adopted by Iza and her eldest brother Creb. Creb is the group's "Mog-ur" or shaman, despite being deformed as a result of a difficult birth caused by his abnormally large head, and the later loss of an arm and eye after being attacked by a cave bear. The Clan worships spiritual representations of Earthly animals, called "totems", that they believe can influence their lives by sending good or bad luck, and for whom Mog-ur acts as an intermediary. Brun allows Iza to treat the dying child and agrees to adopt her providing Creb can discover her personal totem spirit.

Through meditation, Creb comes to believe that the child may be protected by the spirit of the cave lion, a powerful totem never given to a woman and only to very few men. He cites the cave lion attack the girl experienced shortly before being discovered as proof that its spirit marked her so that she could be adopted into the Clan. The people call her Ayla, the closest they can come to pronouncing her birth name. After traveling with them for a while and starting to heal, Ayla wanders away from the group when they stop to discuss what they should do since they haven't found a new home, and discovers a huge, beautiful cave, perfect for their needs. Many of the people begin to regard Ayla as lucky, especially since good fortune continues to come their way as she lives among them.

In Auel's books, Neanderthals possess only limited vocal apparatus and rarely speak, but have a highly developed sign language. They do not laugh or even smile, and they do not cry; when Ayla weeps, Iza thinks she has an eye disease.

Ayla's different thought processes lead her to break important Clan customs, particularly the taboo against females handling weapons. She is self-willed and spirited, but tries hard to fit in with the Neanderthals, although she has to learn everything first-hand; she does not possess the ancestral memories of the Clan that enable them to do certain tasks after being shown only once.

Iza is concerned that when Ayla grows up nobody will want her as their mate, making her a burden to the group. She therefore trains Ayla as a medicine woman of her line, the most prestigious line of medicine women of the entire Clan. This will give Ayla her own status, independent of whether or not she is mated. It takes Iza much longer to train Ayla than it will her own daughter, Uba, since Ayla does not possess the memories of the Clan. 

Ayla's main antagonist in the novel is Broud, son of the leader Brun, who feels that she takes credit and attention away from him. As the two mature, the hatred in Broud's heart festers. When they are young adults, he brutally rapes Ayla in a bid to demonstrate his total control over her, and he continues to assault her multiple times a day. She sinks into a depression that leaves her despondent and disinterested, and quickly becomes pregnant. Iza explains to Ayla that her unattractive appearance compared to a Clan woman will likely preclude her from obtaining a mate before she gives birth - a circumstance Iza's people believe will bring  the group bad luck. Having dreamed of being a mother for most of her life and convinced that this may be her only chance due to her powerful totem, Ayla refuses Iza's suggestion that she take medicine to lose the child. Following a difficult pregnancy and a near-fatal labor, Ayla rejoices in the birth of a son but because he has a number of Cro-Magnon features, he is classified by the Clan as deformed and is almost taken away from her.

The book ends with Creb's death, Broud's succession to the leadership and his banishment of Ayla, who sets off to find other people of her own kind. Her son Durc remains with the tribe.

In the movie:

Ayla was banished twice but on the second time, she left her son to be with the tribe. The first time she was banished was because she held a weapon. Second time was because she stood against Broud. But Broud's father has acknowledged that Ayla is stronger than his son. Iza died first and Creb didn't die in the movie. It appears that Broud's leadership was taken away from since he lost in the fight with Ayla and his father mentioned that Broud was fighting with a "spirit" and that he lost. Ayla reminded her son that she and Durc has the same spirit forever, setting up on a journey on her own. Leaving Durc to lead the clan in the future.

Sequels
The sequel, The Valley of Horses, continues Ayla's story, which is further developed in other books of the Earth's Children series, which include The Mammoth Hunters; The Plains of Passage; The Shelters of Stone; and the sixth and final installment in the series, The Land of Painted Caves.

Background
The archaeological and paleontological research for this book was carried out by Auel from her public library, by attending archaeological conventions, and touring extensively on sites with briefings by working field archaeologists. Some of the descriptions are based on the first adult Neanderthal skeletons found in Iraq from the cave burial at Shanidar, dating between 60-80,000 years BP. Other data is clearly linked to the widespread 
Aurignacian culture and Gravettian culture, and their tell-tale Venus figurines which Auel uses as one center of her Cro-Magnon religious practices.

Film and television adaptations
In 1986, the novel was adapted into a film directed by Michael Chapman and starring Daryl Hannah.

In 2014, the Lifetime television network ordered a pilot episode, based on the series of novels. Ron Howard, Brian Grazer, Jean M. Auel, and Linda Woolverton are executive producers, with Woolverton writing the teleplay. The launch was slated for some time in 2015.

Despite reports of plans to shoot a pilot for a series to have started in 2016, with Ireland as one location, this plan was canceled by Lifetime and has been shopped around to various networks with no luck.  It is presumed to be dead, as of March 2016.

See also

 The Clan of the Cave Bear (film)
 Earth's Children (novel series)
 Use of animals during the Gravettian period
 Aurignacian culture
 Gravettian culture
 Neanderthal extinction hypotheses
 The Inheritors
 Venus figurines

References

External links

 Jean M. Auel Official web site
 
 Photos of the first edition of The Clan of the Cave Bear

Earth's Children
1980 American novels
American novels adapted into films
Fiction about neanderthals
Novels set in prehistory
Crown Publishing Group books